Fr Austin (Liam) Flannery OP, was a Dominican priest, editor, publisher and social justice campaigner.

Born Liam Flannery at Rearcross in County Tipperary on 10 January 1925, he was the eldest of seven children produced by William K. Flannery and his wife Margaret (née Butler). He was educated at St. Flannan's College in Ennis, completing his secondary education at Dominican College, Newbridge, County Kildare.

He joined the Dominican Order, in September 1944, led to studies in theology at St Mary's Priory, Tallaght, and then at Blackfriars, Oxford. Joining the Dominicans he chose the name Austin, he was ordained a priest in 1950. He continued his studies at the Angelicum University in Rome. After his studies he taught Latin in Newbridge College and then theology at Glenstal Abbey, County Limerick.

Flannery edited the Dominican bi-monthly journal entitled Doctrine and Life from 1958 to 1988, while at St. Saviour’s Priory, Dublin where he also served as prior from 195 to 1960. He also edited the Religious Life Review. He published many English language documents on the second vatican council.

Flannery's campaigning to end apartheid in South Africa, led to involvement with Kader Asmal, and the founding the Irish Anti-Apartheid Movement, of which he served as chairman and president. In the late sixties his campaigning on behalf of the Dublin Housing Action Committee, due to its association with republicans and left wing activists, led him to being accused of being a communist. He was dismissed in the Dail by the then Minister for Finance, a certain Charles Haughey, as "a gullible cleric".

He died of a heart attack aged 83 on 21 October 2008, and is buried in the Dominican plot at Glasnevin Cemetery.

References

1925 births
2008 deaths
Alumni of Blackfriars, Oxford
Burials at Glasnevin Cemetery
Irish Dominicans
Irish magazine editors
20th-century Irish Roman Catholic priests
Irish schoolteachers
People educated at Newbridge College
People educated at St Flannan's College
People from County Tipperary
Pontifical University of Saint Thomas Aquinas alumni